A posset (also historically spelled poshote, poshotte, poosay) was originally a popular British hot drink made of milk curdled with wine or ale, often spiced, which was often used as a remedy.

The original drink became extinct and the name was revived in the 19th century and applied to a cream, sugar and citrus-based confection, which is consumed today as a cold set dessert nearly indistinguishable from syllabub.

Introduction 

To make the drink, milk was heated to a boil, then mixed with wine or ale, which curdled it, and the mixture was usually spiced with nutmeg and cinnamon.

It was considered a specific remedy for some minor illnesses, such as a cold, and a general remedy for others, as even today people drink hot milk to help them get to sleep.

History 

The OED traces the word to the 15th century: various Latin vocabularies translate balducta, bedulta, or casius as "poshet", "poshoote", "possyt", or "possot".  Russell's Boke of Nurture (c. 1460) lists various dishes and ingredients that "close a mannes stomak", including "þe possate".  Posset is frequently used as a starting point for other recipes (e.g. "Make a styf Poshote of Milke an Ale", and "Take cowe Mylke, & set it ouer þe fyre, & þrow þer-on Saunderys, & make a styf poshotte of Ale", each of which is the first sentence of a longer recipe).  Recipes for it appear in other 15th-century sources: boil milk, add either wine or ale "and no salt", let it cool, gather the curds and discard the whey, and season with ginger, sugar, and possibly "sweet wine" and candied anise. Certain monks would make a posset including eggs and figs, a possible precursor to eggnog.

In 14th and 15th century cookery manuals, a possibly-related word, spelled variously "possenet", "postnet", or "posnet", is used to mean a small pot or saucepan. In 16th-century and later sources, possets are generally made from lemon or other citrus juice, cream and sugar. Eggs are often added. Some recipes used breadcrumbs to thicken the beverage.

"Posset sets" for mixing and serving possets were popular gifts, and valuable ones (often made of silver) were heirlooms.  Such sets contained a posset "pot", or "bowl", or "cup" to serve it in, a container for mixing it in, and usually various containers for the ingredients, as well as spoons.  The posset set that the Spanish ambassador gave Queen Mary I of England and King Philip II of Spain when they became betrothed in 1554 is believed to have been made by Benvenuto Cellini and is of crystal, gold, precious gems, and enamel.  It is on display at Hatfield House in England and consists of a large, stemmed, covered bowl; two open, stemmed vessels; a covered container; three spoons; and two forks.

The word "posset" is mostly used nowadays for a cold set dessert invented in the late 19th c., containing cream and lemon, similar to syllabub. It is also used to refer to the semi-digested milk brought up by babies after a feed.

In popular culture 

 Lady Macbeth uses poisoned possets to knock out the guards outside Duncan's quarters in William Shakespeare's Macbeth, Act II, Scene ii:

 The doors are open, and the surfeited grooms
 Do mock their charge with snores. I have drugg'd their possets
 That death and nature do contend about them,
 Whether they live or die.

 David Balfour, the narrator in Robert Louis Stevenson's Kidnapped, makes a reference to possets in the sense of being pampered:

 It was suggested as a remedy for the character of Stephen after he sees a ghost in the 1973 BBC adaptation of M. R. James’s Lost Hearts
 "But I was by this time so weary that I could have slept twelve hours at a stretch; I had the taste of sleep in my throat; my joints slept even when my mind was waking; the hot smell of the heather, and the drone of the wild bees, were like possets to me; and every now and again I would give a jump and find I had been dozing."

 Kay Harker, of John Masefield's book The Box of Delights, takes a posset to help clear his head, on the advice of the local police inspector. The posset is said to be a jorum of hot milk, egg, treacle and nutmeg.
 The Warden in Incarceron says that Claudia used to give her young, ailing tutor Jared sweetmeats and possets. This was used to illustrate how she only cares for Jared.
 In The Silver Chair by C.S. Lewis, the queen of Harfang asks that one of the protagonists, Jill Pole, be given "...all you can think of—possets and comfits and caraways and lullabies and toys."
 Mary Renault has Bagoas give Alexander the Great an egg posset with honey, wine and cheese to break a long fast in her novel The Persian Boy.  
 In episode 10, "June", of the 2005/2006 BBC British historical documentary TV series, "Tales from the Green Valley" (part of the "BBC historic farm series"), "sheep washer's Posset" is mentioned.  
 In the 2015 BBC dramatization of the Poldark novels, Verity Poldark notes that her duties include "[dosing] the servants with possets when they are ill."
 In the novel Chesapeake by James Michener, possets were served on the Eastern Shore before retiring, "for they were conducive to sleep and good digestion."
 In Season 3, episode 10 of the original “Upstairs, Downstairs”, a Christmas- themed episode entitled “Goodwill to All Men”, Georgina is given a hot posset after a long day in cold weather.

See also
 Brose / Atholl brose

 Caudle
 Eggnog
 Hot toddy
 List of hot beverages

Notes

References

https://sites.google.com/a/elementalmixology.com/www/drink-genres/possets/a-little-posset-history
https://www.smithsonianmag.com/arts-culture/pass-the-posset-the-medieval-eggnog-25860188/

External links

Milk-based drinks
Historical alcoholic drinks
Mixed drinks
Hot drinks
Traditional medicine